Famcucine–Campagnolo was an Italian professional cycling team that existed from 1980 to 1982. Its main sponsors were kitchen manufacturer Famcucine and bicycle part manufacturer Campagnolo. Francesco Moser rode for the team in 1981 and 1982.

References

External links

Cycling teams based in Italy
Defunct cycling teams based in Italy
1980 establishments in Italy
1982 disestablishments in Italy
Cycling teams established in 1980
Cycling teams disestablished in 1982
Campagnolo